St. Paul's Cathedral in Syracuse, New York was designed by Henry Dudley, who worked with Frank Wills until Wills' early death in 1857.

The church is located at 310 Montgomery Street in downtown Syracuse.

The White family

The locally prominent White family was closely associated with St. Paul's since its founding. It was observed that "the name [White] should always be woven into the history of St. Paul’s."
 Horace White (1802-1860; banker and businessman) was a vestryman for over twenty years and warden, and is honored with a stained glass window on the south aisle
 Clara Dickson White (1811-1882; wife of Horace) donated money for construction of the church tower. The church spire was dedicated in her honor.
 Hamilton White (1807-1865; banker and brother of Horace), was a vestryman for many years and served on the building committee, and is honored by the White Memorial Chancel Window.

The spire and windows were dedicated in 1907 by Horace and Clara's sons Andrew Dickson White (1832-1918; co-founder and first president of Cornell University) and Horace Keep White (1835-1915; banker and head of a salt company).

See also
List of the Episcopal cathedrals of the United States
List of cathedrals in the United States

References

External links

Churches in Syracuse, New York
Episcopal church buildings in New York (state)
Paul, Syracuse
National Register of Historic Places in Syracuse, New York
Churches on the National Register of Historic Places in New York (state)
Historic American Buildings Survey in New York (state)
Gothic Revival church buildings in New York (state)
1884 establishments in New York (state)